The diocese of Phát Diệm is a Roman Catholic diocese of Vietnam. The bishop position has been vacant since April 2007.  However, on July 25, 2009, Pope Benedict XVI selected Rev. Joseph Nguyen Nang to head the diocese.

The creation of the diocese in present form was declared November 24, 1960.

The diocese covers an area of 1,787 km², and is a suffragan diocese of the Archdiocese of Hanoi.

By 2004, the diocese of Phát Diêm had about 144,721 believers (15.9% of the population), 31 priests and 65 parishes.

Queen of the Rosary Cathedral in Kim Sơn District (Ninh Bình Province) has been assigned as the Cathedral of the diocese. This cathedral complex was built between 1875 and 1899 and comprises four churches and one basilica, as well as several parks, ponds and grottos.

References

External links

 

1960 establishments in North Vietnam
Christian organizations established in 1960
Roman Catholic dioceses and prelatures established in the 20th century
Phat Diem
Phat Diem, Roman Catholic Diocese of